37 Leonis Minoris is a single, yellow-hued star in the northern constellation of Leo Minor. It is faintly visible to the naked eye with an apparent visual magnitude of 4.68. The star is moving closer to the Sun with a heliocentric radial velocity of −8 km/s. The annual parallax shift of  provides a distance estimate of roughly 580 light years.

The Bright Star Catalogue lists this star with a stellar classification of G2.5 IIa, indicating it is an evolved G-type bright giant. Gray et al. (2001) gave it a class of G1 II, while Keenan and McNeil (1989) assigned this star to the giant class G2.5 IIIa. It has an estimated 3.72 times the mass of the Sun and about 31 times the Sun's radius. The star is around 200 million years old with a projected rotational velocity of 6.4 km/s. It is radiating about 438 times the Sun's luminosity from its enlarged photosphere at an effective temperature of 5,468 K.

References

G-type bright giants
Leo Minor
Durchmusterung objects
Leonis Minoris, 37
092125
052098
4166